Armand Bernard (22 June 1928 – 24 June 2010) was a Canadian wrestler. He competed in the men's freestyle featherweight at the 1952 Summer Olympics.

References

External links
 

1932 births
2010 deaths
Canadian male sport wrestlers
Olympic wrestlers of Canada
Wrestlers at the 1952 Summer Olympics
Commonwealth Games competitors for Canada
Wrestlers at the 1954 British Empire and Commonwealth Games
Sportspeople from Montreal
20th-century Canadian people